Michael A. Crosby is a retired United States Army command sergeant major who has served as the senior enlisted leader of the United States Army Futures Command. CSM Crosby acted as the principal advisor to the commander and staff on matters of health, welfare, morale, professional development and the effective utilization of personnel assigned to the command.

Military career 

Crosby enlisted in the United States Army in August, 1988. He has a bachelor's degree in criminal justice from American Military University and a master's degree for business administration in human resources management from Trident University. He attended the Army Strategic Leader Development Program-Intermediate Course, Executive Leaders Course, and Keystone Leaders Course.

Crosby is married to Command Sergeant Major Jill Crosby.

References

This work incorporates material in the public domain in the United States because it is a work of the United States Federal Government under the terms of Title 17, Chapter 1, Section 105 of the US Code.

Year of birth missing (living people)
Living people
African-American United States Army personnel
21st-century African-American people
United States Army non-commissioned officers
United States Army soldiers